Rudaea  is a Gram-negative, aerobic and rod-shaped genus of Pseudomonadota from the family of Rhodanobacteraceae with one known species (Rudaea cellulosilytica). Rudaea cellulosilytica has been isolated from soil from the Daechung Island in Korea.

References

Xanthomonadales
Bacteria genera
Monotypic bacteria genera